John H. H. McNamee was mayor of Cambridge, Massachusetts from 1902 to 1904.  
In 1903, he lost his reelection campaign to Augustine J. Daly by 70 votes.

He was also the second grand knight of the Cambridge Council of the Knights of Columbus.

References

Year of birth missing
Year of death missing
Mayors of Cambridge, Massachusetts